Agave geminiflora is a species of Agave endemic to the Mexican State of Nayarit. Common name is twin flowered agave.

Agave geminiflora can have 100-200 leaves which are linear, stiff, dark green, and have convex edges with white horny lines and curled threads. The flowers are 5 or 6 centimeters long on a tall inflorescence.

References

External links
Dave's Garden, PlantFiles: Agave Agave geminiflora
Mountain States Wholesale Nursery, plant database, Agave geminiflora

boscii
Flora of Nayarit
Plants described in 1816